Mike Woloschuk (born May 9, 1970, in Melville, Saskatchewan, Canada) is a Canadian-Australian curler.

At the international level, he is a two-time  curler.

Personal life
As of the 2007 World Championships, Woloschuk was living in Brisbane. He retired from international curling after the 2007 World Men's Curling Championships in Edmonton. Since then, he spent time living back in Canada, USA and he currently resides on the Sunshine Coast in Australia, working as a mining industry executive.

Teams and events

References

External links

Living people
1970 births
Sportspeople from Melville, Saskatchewan
Australian male curlers
Pacific-Asian curling champions

Canadian male curlers
Curlers from Saskatchewan
Canadian emigrants to Australia
Sportspeople from Brisbane